The 1999 ANFA National League Cup was a domestic cup association football competition organised by the All Nepal Football Association. It was held on 20 November to 30 November 1999, and was called the 1999 ANFA Coca-Cola National League Cup for sponsorship reasons.

The winners of the ANFA League Cup qualify for the 1998–99 Asian Cup Winners' Cup.

First round proper
Champion of each district advances to second round. Unlike other districts, Kathmandu Valley teams participated in a qualifying group stage tournament.

Kanchanpur District

Chitwan District

Dang District
The champion of the Dang District is unknown.

Morang District

Jhapa District

Sindhupalchok District

Parsa District

Saptari District

Dhanusa District

Sunsari District

Mahottari District
The champion of the Mahottari District is unknown.

*Not to be confused with Bharatpur Chitwan

Ilam District

*Unclear if Jeetpur participated or not.

Makawanpur District
The champion of the Makawanpur District is unknown.

Kailali District

Kaski District

Rupandehi District

Palpa District

Kavre District

Banke District

Kathmandu Valley

Group A

Group B

Group C

Group D

Second round proper
23 teams qualified from the first round compete to secure a berth into the third round. Clubs are separated based on their districts, and grouped further (apart from the Kathmandu district. All teams qualified into the second round from Kathmandu Valley were given an automatic bye into the fourth round, however a sub knockout tournament was played to determine third round fixtures (the winner being placed on fourth round group A, runner up placed on fourth round group B.

Kathmandu Valley

Semi-finals

*Walkover awarded to Manang Marsyangdi Club

Finals

Western districts

Group A

Group B

Group C

Group D

Eastern districts

Group A

Group B

Group C

Third round proper

Western districts

Eastern districts

Fourth round proper
Mahendra Police and Tribhuvan Army were granted automatic byes into the fourth round as 1998 ANFA League Cup finalists.

Group A

Group B

Knockout stage

Semi-finals

Third-place match

Final 
The finals of the 1999 ANFA National League Cup saw a Departmental Derby between long-term rivals Mahendra Police Club and Tribhuvan Army Club.

See also
ANFA National League Cup
Nepal National League
Martyr's Memorial League
ANFA Cup
All Nepal Football Association
Football in Nepal

References

Football competitions in Nepal
1999 in Nepalese sport